The 1930 Volta a Catalunya was the 12th edition of the Volta a Catalunya cycle race and was held from 7 September to 14 September 1930. The race started and finished in Barcelona. The race was won by Mariano Cañardo.

Route and stages

General classification

References

1930
Volta
1930 in Spanish road cycling
September 1930 sports events